Birgitta Maria Cecilia Nilsson (born 15 July 1957) is a Swedish actress. She has appeared at many theatres. She is married to Krister Henriksson.

Nilsson started acting in theatre at age of six at Vår teater at Medborgarplatsen in Stockholm. As a student she attended the Adolf Fredrik's Music School in Stockholm. Her first theater appearance was in the play Woyzeck at the Royal Dramatic Theatre in 1968, and she also appeared in Minns du den stad (directed by Per Anders Fogelström) at Stockholm City Theatre in 1970–1971.

In 1973–1974 she hosted the children's program Fredax, and after that she hosted Lördags 1974–1975.

From 1978 to 1981 she studied at the Swedish National Academy of Mime and Acting. After the education she was engaged at Helsingborg City Theatre. From 1983 to 1988 she worked at Stockholm City Theatre.

In 1989 Nilsson received the Vilhelm Moberg-Award of Teaterförbundet, and in 2007 the Riksteatern Scholarship. In 2012 she received a Guldbagge Award for her appearance in the 2011 film Simon and the Oaks.

Selected filmography
2016 - Modus (TV)
2011 - Simon and the Oaks
2009 - Morden (TV)
2007 - How Soon Is Now? (TV)
2006 - Wallander – Fotografen (TV)
2006 - Wallander – Den svaga punkten (TV)
2005 - Kim Novak badade aldrig i Genesarets sjö
2004 - Graven (TV series) (TV)
2002 - Outside Your Door
2000 - A Summer Tale
2000 - Hur som helst är han jävligt död
2000 - Barnen på Luna (TV)
1997 - Lilla Jönssonligan på styva linan
1996 - Lilla Jönssonligan och cornflakeskuppen
1993 - Dockpojken
1985 - August Strindberg: ett liv (TV)
1973 - Den vita stenen (TV)

References

External links
Cecilia Nilsson at Svensk Filmdatabas

Swedish actresses
Living people
1957 births
Best Supporting Actress Guldbagge Award winners